João Lopes Cardoso (6 April 1937 – 4 May 2019), commonly known as Nartanga, was a Portuguese professional footballer.

Career statistics

Club

Notes

References

1937 births
2019 deaths
Bissau-Guinean footballers
Portuguese footballers
Association football forwards
Primeira Liga players
Segunda Divisão players
S.L. Benfica footballers
S.C. Covilhã players
Sport Benfica e Castelo Branco players
A.C. Marinhense players
S.C. Beira-Mar players
F.C. Penafiel players